was a town located in Minamiuwa District, Ehime Prefecture, Japan.

As of 2003, the town had an estimated population of 9,471 and a density of 188.18 persons per km2. The total area was 50.33 km2.

On October 1, 2004, Mishō, along with the towns of Ipponmatsu, Jōhen and Nishiumi, and the village of Uchiumi (all from Minamiuwa District), was merged to create the town of Ainan.

Kanjizaiji, one of the Shikoku Pilgrimage temples, is located in the town.

Climate

References

External links
Official website of Ainan in Japanese

Dissolved municipalities of Ehime Prefecture
Ainan, Ehime